The Bafia language is a Bantu language spoken by 60,000 people in Cameroon according to 1991 figures.

Overview
It is used in the Bafia subdivision of the Mbam and Inoubou Division in Center Province in southwestern Cameroon. There are two varieties, Kpa and Pey. The former referred to the language was Rɨkpa, and to themselves as Bekpak; the latter Rɨpey.  Pey may be a distinct language.

References

Bafia languages
Languages of Cameroon